Rika Takayama (born 27 August 1994) is a Japanese judoka. She is the gold medallist in the -78 kg at the 2018 Judo Grand Slam Ekaterinburg

References

External links
 
 

1994 births
Living people
Japanese female judoka
21st-century Japanese women